George Marshall (12 September 1832 – 13 July 1905) was an Australian cricketer. He played one first-class match for Tasmania in 1858.

See also
 List of Tasmanian representative cricketers

References

External links
 

1832 births
1905 deaths
Australian cricketers
Tasmania cricketers
Cricketers from Tasmania